Ellis Ridge is an ice-covered ridge,  long and  wide, extending northeast from Jenkins Heights between Dorchuck Glacier and Keys Glacier, on the Walgreen Coast of Marie Byrd Land, Antarctica. It was mapped by the United States Geological Survey (USGS) from surveys and U.S. Navy aerial photographs, 1959–67, and from U.S. Landsat imagery, 1972–73. It was named by the Advisory Committee on Antarctic Names for Melvin Y. Ellis, a USGS cartographer who was a member of the USGS satellite surveying team at South Pole Station, winter party 1974.

References 

Ridges of Marie Byrd Land